AldridgeUTC@MediaCityUK is a University Technical College for students aged 14–18 (Key Stage 4 and 5) at MediaCityUK Salford Quays, England. The college specialise in creative and digital courses. The UTC opened in September 2015 by BBC Director-General Tony Hall and BBC Presenter Chelsee Jade Healey and Lisa Riley and Founding Principal Ms Anne Casey. The UTC joined the Aldridge Foundation Multi Academy Trust in September 2018.

Sponsors
The three key sponsors of the UTC are The Aldridge Foundation, The Lowry and the University of Salford.

Admissions
Applications to join this September are open now on the website. Places are limited in both Year 10 and Year 12.

UTC@MediaCityUK opened with a total of 310 student places starting in Years 10 and 12.

Due to being a state funded school there are no admission fees or entry examination. Their catchment area varies from Salford (Zone A) all the way to Tameside (Zone C).

Curriculum
Students choose one of three pathway specialisms at Key Stage 4: 
Pathway 1) TV and Film Production,
Pathway 2) Interactive Media and Gaming or Pathway 3) Digital Design. All students in Key Stage 4 study GCSE English Language & Literature, GCSE Maths and GCSE Combined or Triple Science. Extra options are available from either GCSE Photography, GCSE Graphics, GCSE History, GCSE Computer Science, BTEC Media Studies or BTEC Digital Information Technology.

At Key Stage 5 students choose one of three pathway specialisms:
Pathway 1) TV and Film Production, Pathway 2) Interactive Media and Gaming or Pathway 3) Digital Design.
The pathway can be taken as a Triple or Double and paired with an A-Level in either Photography, Graphics, Media Studies or History.

The UTC specialises in digital and creative content, with employer partners playing a key role in the curriculum of the UTC by setting real life work experience projects. Through the projects, students study toward Level 2 and 3 qualifications.

Governing Body
The governors are: 
 Chair: Brent Thomas (Interim)
 Chenayi Mutambasere
 Colin Grand
 John McCarthy
 Nigel Howe
 Julia Fawcett OBE
 Jane Wood-Greaves - Staff Governor
 Nicky Hill - Staff Governor
 Vivien Chasey - Parent Governor 
 Eloise Edwards - Parent Governor
 Rhyse Cathcart - parent governor

Standards
A 2018 Ofsted inspection found that the UTC "requires improvement". Since joining the Multi Academy Trust there has not been an Ofsted Inspection.

References

University Technical Colleges
Secondary schools in Salford
Educational institutions established in 2015
2015 establishments in England